The Bay of Quinte is a long, narrow bay shaped like the letter "Z" on the northern shore of Lake Ontario in the province of Ontario, Canada. It is just west of the head of the Saint Lawrence River that drains the Great Lakes into the Gulf of Saint Lawrence.

The name "Quinte" is derived from "Kenté" or Kentio, an Iroquoian village located near the south shore of the Bay. Later on, an early French Catholic mission was built at Kenté, located on the north shore of what is now Prince Edward County, leading to the Bay being named after the Mission. Officially, in the Mohawk language, the community is called , which means "the place of the bay".

The Bay, as it is known locally, provides some of the best trophy walleye angling in North America as well as most sport fish common to the great lakes. The bay is subject to algal blooms in late summer.  Zebra mussels as well as the other invasive species found in the Great Lakes are present.

The Quinte area played a vital role in bootlegging during prohibition in the United States, with large volumes of liquor being produced in the area, and shipped via boat on the bay to Lake Ontario finally arriving in New York State where it was distributed. Illegal sales of liquor accounted for many fortunes in and around Belleville.

Tourism in the area is significant, especially in the summer months due to the Bay of Quinte and its fishing, local golf courses, provincial parks, and wineries.

Geography

The northern side of the bay is defined by Ontario's mainland, while the southern side follows the shore of the Prince Edward County headland. From there it turns south-southwest again for another , running past Big Island on the south and Belleville on the north. The width of the bay rarely exceeds . The bay ends at Trenton (Quinte West) and the Trent River, both also on the north side. The Murray Canal has been cut through the "Carrying Place", the few kilometres separating the end of the bay and Lake Ontario on the west side. The Trent River is part of the Trent-Severn Waterway, a canal connecting Lake Ontario to Lake Simcoe and then Georgian Bay on Lake Huron.

There are several sub-bays off the Bay of Quinte, including Hay Bay, Big Bay, and Muscote Bay.

Bay of Quinte Region
Quinte is also a region comprising several communities situated along the Bay of Quinte, including Quinte West, Brighton and the City of Belleville, which is the largest city in the Quinte Region, and represents a midpoint between Montreal, Ottawa, and Toronto.

The Greater Bay of Quinte area includes the municipalities of Brighton, Quinte West, Belleville, Prince Edward County, and Greater Napanee as well as the Native Tyendinaga Mohawk Territory. Overall population of the area exceeds 200,000.

Mohawks of the Bay of Quinte
The Mohawks of the Bay of Quinte (Kenhtè:ke Kanyen'kehá:ka) live on traditional Tyendinaga Mohawk Territory.

The community takes its name from a variant spelling of Mohawk leader Joseph Brant's traditional Mohawk name, Thayendanegea (standardized spelling Thayentiné:ken), which means 'two pieces of fire wood beside each other'. Officially, in the Mohawk language, the community is called "Kenhtè:ke" (Tyendinaga), which means "on the bay", and was the birthplace of Tekanawí:ta. The Cayuga name is Tyendinaga, Tayęda:ne:gęˀ or Detgayę:da:negęˀ, "land of two logs."

Communities
 Belleville 
 Quinte West 
 Brighton
 Shannonville
 Napanee
 Deseronto
 Tyendinaga Mohawk Territory
 Rossmore
 Ameliasburgh
 Picton
 Consecon
 Carrying Place

Education 
The Quinte Region, specifically the City of Belleville, is home to Loyalist College of Applied Arts and Technology. Other post-secondary schools in the region include Maxwell College of Advanced Technology, CDI College, and Quinte Literacy. Secondary schools in the region include Albert College (private school) and Sir James Whitney (a school for the deaf and severely hearing-impaired).

Industry and employment 
The Bay of Quinte region is a hub for industry in eastern Ontario. The region is home to a diverse cluster of domestic and multi-national manufacturing and logistics companies.  Sectors include; food processing, auto-parts, plastics and packaging, consumer goods, and more.  The region's close proximity to North American markets, strong labour force and start-up and operating costs have attracted attention and new investment from companies all over the globe.  Industry in the Bay of Quinte region is supported by a workforce of over 11,000.

Investment attraction and industrial retention are supported regionally by the Quinte Economic Development Commission  

Just a few of over 350 industries located in the Bay of Quinte Region include:
 Schütz Canada, German manufacturer of intermediate bulk containers
 Essroc Canada a division of Italcementi 
 Magna Autosystems - lighting division (3 facilities)
 Hannon Climate Control Canada Ltd.—Automotive parts
 Procter and Gamble Inc.— Feminine hygiene products
 Kellogg — Breakfast cereal manufacturer
 Kruger - manufacturing facial and toilet tissue for the away from home market
 Hain Celestial - manufacturing Yves Veggie Cuisine products
 Sprague Foods - canned and jarred soups and beans
 Donini Chocolate - a division of John Vince Foods
 Redpath Sugar
 Trenton Cold Storage Group Inc.—Refrigerated warehousing and distribution. Custom co-packing
 Lactalis Canada—Black Diamond Cheese Division—Cheese manufacturing and packaging
 Avaya—A telecommunications research and product development centre, providing customers worldwide with advanced communications and networking systems, and creating next-generation internet telephony solutions.
 Research Casting International—Canadian company specializing in moulding and casting for the production of museum exhibits
 Cooney Transport Ltd.—Trucking company
 Wellington Mushroom Farm / Highline Produce—Mushroom farm
 Domtech—Copper wiring
 ClearWater Design Canoe and Kayak—Boat manufacturer
The SAB Group of Companies Limited—Consumer goods company
Mapco Plastics—Biodegradable plastic packaging manufacturer
Citipack Distribution—Cash and carry
Babars Bazaar—International commodity trading
Jobsters Staffing—Staffing agency

Images

References

External links

 Official website of Belleville
 Official website of Quinte West
 Official website for the Region of Bay of Quinte

Central Ontario
Quinte
Bays of Lake Ontario